Micranurida is a genus of arthropods belonging to the family Neanuridae.

The species of this genus are found in Europe and Northern America.

Species:
 Micranurida agenjoi Simon, 1979 
 Micranurida anophthalmica Stach, 1949

References

Collembola
Springtail genera